Noh Yong-Hoon (born 29 March 1986) is a South Korean football player who last played for Daejeon Citizen.

Career statistics

External links 
 

1986 births
Living people
Association football defenders
South Korean footballers
Gyeongnam FC players
Busan IPark players
Daejeon Hana Citizen FC players
Gangwon FC players
K League 1 players
Association football midfielders